Stadion SRC Sesvete is a football stadium in Sesvete, Croatia. It serves as home stadium for football club NK Sesvete.  The stadium has an all seater capacity of 3,500 spectators.

References
World Stadiums: Croatia

Sesvete
Sports venues in Zagreb